Dr. Haji Abdul Ghani bin Ahmad JP (born 3 June 1970) is a Malaysian politician. He was twice the Member of the State Assembly of Kedah for the seat of Ayer Hitam, representing the Pan-Malaysian Islamic Party (PAS). His two terms were from 1999 to 2004 and from 2008 to 2013 In the latter term he was a member of the Executive Council of Kedah responsible for Information and Entrepreneur Development.

Abdul Ghani was first elected to the Kedah State Assembly for Ayer Hitam in the 1999 election, but was defeated in 2004 by Othman Aziz of Barisan Nasional (BN). In the 2008 election Abdul Ghani won back the seat in a re-match against Othman. With PAS winning government in Kedah in the 2008 election (as part of the Pakatan Rakyat coalition), Abdul Ghani was appointed to the State Executive Council in March 2010. In the 2013 election, PAS lost the Kedah state government control and Abdul Ghani also lost his state seat, to UMNO's Mukhriz Mahathir.

In the 2018 election, Abdul Ghani lost to Mukhriz Mahathir again, who was contesting under the Malaysian United Indigenous Party (PPBM) ticket, in a three-corner fight with UMNO for the Jerlun parliamentary seat.

Election results

References

Living people
1970 births
People from Kedah
Malaysian Muslims
Malaysian people of Malay descent
Malaysian Islamic Party politicians
Members of the Kedah State Legislative Assembly
Kedah state executive councillors